Four major human polls make up the 2020 NCAA Division I men's soccer rankings: United Soccer Coaches, Top Drawer Soccer, Soccer America, and CollegeSoccerNews.com.  However, due to the COVID-19 pandemic, only the United Soccer Coaches poll was released.  No pre-season poll was released and a five team poll was released on September 22, 2020 as the first poll of the season.  The United Soccer Coaches resumed releasing a poll for the Spring Season on March 2, 2021.

Top Drawer Soccer released a national ranking on February 1 for the Spring Season.  The ranking took into account records of teams that played in the fall.

Legend

Fall 2020

United Soccer Coaches 
Source:

Spring 2021

United Soccer Coaches 
Source:

Top Drawer Soccer

Source:

References 

College men's soccer rankings in the United States